The titis, or titi monkeys, are New World monkeys of the subfamily Callicebinae, which contains three extant genera: Cheracebus, Callicebus, and Plecturocebus. This subfamily also contains the extinct genera Miocallicebus, Homunculus, and Carlocebus.

Titi monkeys live in South America, from Colombia, Ecuador and Peru, east through Brazil, and south to Bolivia and northern Paraguay.

Description
The different titi species vary substantially in coloring, but resemble each other in most other physical ways. They have long, soft fur, and it is usually reddish, brownish, grayish or blackish, and in most species the underside is lighter or more reddish than the upperside. Some species have contrasting blackish or whitish foreheads, while all members of the genus Cheracebus have a white half-collar. The tail is always furry and is not prehensile.

Biology
Diurnal and arboreal, titis predominantly prefer dense forests near water. They easily jump from branch to branch, earning them their German name, Springaffen (jumping monkeys). They sleep at night, but can also take a midday nap.

Titis are territorial. They live in family groups that consist of parents and their offspring, about two to seven animals in total. They defend their territory by shouting and chasing off intruders, but rarely engage in actual fighting. Their grooming and communication is important for the co-operation of the group. They can typically be seen in pairs sitting or sleeping with tails entwined.

The diet of the titis consists mainly of fruits, although they also eat leaves, flowers, insects, bird eggs and small vertebrates.

Titis are monogamous, mating for life. The female bears a single young after about a five-month gestation. Twins occur rarely, having been documented in only 1.4% of all births in captive groups of Plecturocebus moloch. While the second infant usually does not survive, cases where neighbouring groups have adopted infants are known, suggesting that twins may be reared successfully under certain circumstances. Often it is the father who cares for the young, carrying it and bringing it to the mother only for nursing. Fathers tend to engage in more grooming, food-sharing, inspecting, aggression and playing with infants than mothers. The young are weaned after 5 months and are fully grown after two years. After three or more years, they leave their family group in order to find a mate. While the life expectancy of most species is unclear, the members of the genus Cheracebus may live for up to 12 years in the wild, while members of the P. moloch group have been known to live for more than 25 years in captivity.

Classification 
The number of known species of titis has doubled in recent years, with eight, P. stephennashi, P. bernhardi, P. caquetensis, P. aureipalatii, P. miltoni, P. urubambensis, P. grovesi, and P. parecis being described from the Amazon basin since 2000. Furthermore, the most recent review uses the phylogenetic species concept (thereby not recognizing the concept of subspecies) rather than the 'traditional' biological species concept. The classification presented here is therefore very different from the classifications used twenty years ago. The naming rights to a recently discovered species were auctioned off (with the funds going to a nonprofit organization), and the winner was the online casino GoldenPalace.com, as reflected in both the common and scientific name of P. aureipalatii. While this typically is a highly unusual event in scientific classification, the possibility of naming a species of titi in exchange for a sizable donation to a nonprofit foundation was also presented a few years before, resulting in P. bernhardi being named after Prince Bernhard of the Netherlands.

Historically, titis were monogeneric and formed the genus Callicebus Thomas, 1903. Owing to the great diversity found across titi monkey species, a new genus-level taxonomy was recently proposed that recognises three genera within the subfamily Callicebinae; Cheracebus Byrne et al. (2016) for the species of the torquatus group (Widow titis); Callicebus Thomas, 1903, for species of the Atlantic Forest personatus group; and Plecturocebus Byrne et al. (2016) for the Amazonian and Chaco titis of the moloch and donacophilus groups.

 Genus Plecturocebus
P. donacophilus group
 White-eared titi, Plecturocebus donacophilus
 Rio Beni titi, Plecturocebus modestus
 Rio Mayo titi, Plecturocebus oenanthe
 Ollala brothers's titi, Plecturocebus olallae
 White-coated titi, Plecturocebus pallescens
 Urubamba brown titi, Plecturocebus urubambensis
 P. moloch group
 Baptista Lake titi, Plecturocebus baptista
 Prince Bernhard's titi, Plecturocebus bernhardi
 Brown titi, Plecturocebus brunneus
 Ashy black titi, Plecturocebus cinerascens
Parecis titi, Plecturocebus parecis
 Hoffmanns's titi, Plecturocebus hoffmannsi
Alta Floresta titi, Plecturocebus grovesi
 Milton's titi, Plecturocebus miltoni
 Red-bellied titi, Plecturocebus moloch
 Vieira's titi, Plecturocebus vieirai
Toppin's titi, Plecturocebus toppini
 Madidi titi, Plecturocebus aureipalatii
 Chestnut-bellied titi, Plecturocebus caligatus
 Caquetá titi, Plecturocebus caquetensis
 Coppery titi, Plecturocebus cupreus
 White-tailed titi, Plecturocebus discolor
 Hershkovitz's titi, Plecturocebus dubius
 Ornate titi, Plecturocebus ornatus
 Stephen Nash's titi, Plecturocebus stephennashi
 Genus Cheracebus
Lucifer titi, Cheracebus lucifer
 Black titi, Cheracebus lugens
 Colombian black-handed titi, Cheracebus medemi
 Red-headed titi, Cheracebus regulus
 Collared titi, Cheracebus torquatus
 Genus Callicebus
Barbara Brown's titi, Callicebus barbarabrownae
 Coimbra Filho's titi, Callicebus coimbrai
 Coastal black-handed titi, Callicebus melanochir
 Black-fronted titi, Callicebus nigrifrons
 Atlantic titi, Callicebus personatus
Genus †Miocallicebus
†Miocallicebus villaviejai
Genus †Carlocebus
†Carlocebus carmenensis
†Carlocebus intermedius
Genus †Homunculus
†Homunculus patagonicus

References

 
Taxa named by R. I. Pocock
Taxa described in 1925

ca:Tití
eu:Titi (animalia)